Plyasovatka is a rural locality (a selo) and the administrative center of Plyasovatskoye Rural Settlement, Verkhnekhavsky District, Voronezh Oblast, Russia. The population was 259 as of 2010. There are 3 streets.

Geography 
Plyasovatka is located 17 km northeast of Verkhnyaya Khava (the district's administrative centre) by road. Pokrovka is the nearest rural locality.

References 

Rural localities in Verkhnekhavsky District